Intermarché–Circus–Wanty is a UCI WorldTeam that is title sponsored by French supermarket chain Intermarché, Belgian engineering firm Wanty and Belgian building materials provider Groupe Gobert Matériaux.
It was founded in 2008. It was based in Belgium and participated in races on the UCI Continental Circuits, and some UCI World Tour events before 2021, after the team bought the UCI license from CCC Pro Team in September 2020.

Team roster

Major wins

National and world champions
2021
 Estonia Time Trial, Rein Taaramäe
2022
 Estonia Time Trial, Rein Taaramäe
 Eritrea Time Trial, Biniam Girmay

References

External links

Cycling teams based in Belgium
Cycling teams established in 2008
UCI WorldTeams
Intermarché–Wanty–Gobert Matériaux